BMAT STEM Academy is a University Technical College within the Harlow College campus in Harlow, Essex, England, which opened in September 2014 as Sir Charles Kao UTC. It was named after the Nobel Prize winning scientist Charles K. Kao who worked and studied at Standard Telecommunication Laboratories in Harlow.

An Ofsted report in April 2017 gave the school a "Requires improvement" grade in all categories; at that time the school had 140 students although its capacity was 500.

From April 2018, the school was re-launched as a member of BMAT, an academy trust which runs schools in Essex including Burnt Mill Academy and Epping St John's. It was renamed to the BMAT STEM Academy.

References

External links
 

University Technical Colleges
Secondary schools in Essex
Educational institutions established in 2014
2014 establishments in England
Anglia Ruskin University